The Devil's Share is a Canadian documentary film, directed by Luc Bourdon and released in 2017. A sequel to his 2008 film The Memories of Angels (La Mémoire des anges), the film is a collage film which uses clips from past National Film Board of Canada films to present a portrait of Montreal in the 1970s.

The film received Prix Iris nominations for Best Documentary, Best Editing in a Documentary (Michel Giroux) and Best Sound in a Documentary (Catherine Van Der Donckt, Jean Paul Vialard) at the 20th Quebec Cinema Awards in 2018, winning the award for Best Sound. It received a Canadian Screen Award nomination for Best Feature Length Documentary, and Michel Giroux was nominated for Best Editing in a Documentary, at the 7th Canadian Screen Awards in 2019.

References

External links
 

2017 films
2017 documentary films
Canadian documentary films
National Film Board of Canada documentaries
Collage film
French-language Canadian films
Canadian avant-garde and experimental films
2010s Canadian films